"Emily" is a single by American rock band Bowling for Soup. It appears on their fourth studio album, Drunk Enough to Dance (2002), as the second track on the album. The song was released as the second single from the album on November 4, 2002, and reached number 67 on the UK Singles Chart. Like most singles by Bowling for Soup, it was written by lead singer Jaret Reddick.

Music video
The music video features the band members in a bar trying to find alternative ways to use the toilet. During the music video, they are seen playing in a bathroom.

Track listing
 "Emily"
 "Change My Mind"
 "Captain Hook"

Charts

References

2002 songs
2003 singles
Bowling for Soup songs
Song recordings produced by Butch Walker
Songs written by Jaret Reddick